The Government Engineering College, Idukki (GECI) is located in the town of Painavu, in Idukki district of the Indian state of Kerala. It is affiliated to the APJ Abdul Kalam Technological University, and is approved by the All India Council for Technical Education (AICTE), New Delhi.

History
The college was established in 2000 under the Directorate of Technical Education of the government of Kerala. It was located at Painavu in government buildings renovated for the purpose. Twenty five acres of land at Kuyilimala near Painavu was transferred to the college for the construction of a permanent campus in August 2000. The first batch of students were admitted in November 2000.

Owing to the delay in obtaining AICTE approval and as per the orders of the High Court of Kerala, three batches of students admitted to the college were transferred to Rajiv Gandhi Institute of Technology, Kottayam in their final year.

The college was inspected by AICTE in April 2003, and approval was granted for admissions on 2003–2004 and later.

GECI has 870 undergraduate students in four batches. The batch of students admitted to the college in 2003 is the first batch rolled out in October 2007.

Campus
The scenic  campus is located at Kuyilimala, Painavu – the headquarters of the Idukki district. The campus is a two-hour road journey from Thodupuzha or Kothamangalam (co-ordinates: 9°50'52"N 76°56'32"E). The campus is situated near State Highway 33 from Thodupuzha to Kattapana.

The cool and picturesque environs of the Idukki wildlife sanctuary located close to the campus form a good setting for the pursuit of higher education.

Academics
The college is affiliated to APJ Abdul Kalam Technological University, and offers Bachelor of Technology programmes in five branches of engineering and technology: 
 Electrical and Electronics Engineering,
 Electronics and Communication Engineering,
 Computer Science and Engineering,
 Mechanical Engineering,
 Information Technology.
The programs have an intake of 66 regular students and six lateral entry students. The courses span eight semesters.

In addition to the five BTech programs, GECI offers three MTech programs:

Electrical and Electronics Engineering
 Power Electronics and Control (since 2011) 
Computer Science Engineering
 Computer Science and System Engineering
Information Technology
 Network Engineering

Admissions
Admissions to the BTech Degree programs are carried out on the basis of rank in the common entrance examination conducted by the Government of Kerala.

Admissions to the MTech Degree programs are carried out on the basis of rank in the GATE conducted by the IITs.

Departments

The college is structured into seven departments: 
Electrical and Electronics Engineering
Electronics and Communication Engineering
Computer Science and Engineering
Information Technology
Mechanical Engineering
General Department
Basic Sciences

Faculty
The faculty are selected by the Public Service Commission, Kerala, on a merit basis.

Staff advisory system
Immediately after admission to the college, each student is assigned a staff adviser. The staff adviser guides the student in curricular and extracurricular activities during the period of study in the college.

Campus discipline
Any act of ragging is dealt with as per the provisions of the Kerala Prohibition of ragging Act, 1998. Students are not allowed to use mobile phones during class hours. While on campus, students carry their college identity cards and comply with the dress code:
 Boys: grey pants, cream shirt and suitable covered footwear,
 Girls: grey pants, cream shirt with grey overcoat and suitable covered footwear.

College library

The college library is in process of expansion. It has around 12000 books in 2500 titles. The library subscribes to 20 national and 12 international journals, five newspapers and some periodicals. Library operations are computerized using SOUL software. 
The library has the following sections:
 Book lending section,
 Reference section,
 Current periodicals section,
 Book bank for SC/ST and poor students,
 Reading room,
 Reprographic section.

Digital library in engineering
The college has access to international journals and technical papers through the Indian National Library in Engineering (INDEST) -AICTE Consortium.

Central computing facility
The Central Computing Facility (CCF) has been set up to supplement the departmental software labs and for sharing of computing resources within the college. CCF has networked PCs, printers and scanners for student use.

Career guidance and placement cell
The college has a Career Guidance and Placement Cell (CGPC); it has contacts with software and industrial houses for campus recruitment drives. The CGPC organizes soft skill development programmes and workshops to motivate students to perform better.

Women’s cell
The women's cell in the college was established in 2006. The cell in close co-ordination with the Idukki district women's council arranges counseling sessions, which can be utilized by both male and female students.

Technical associations
The technical associations provide students the venue to improve their technical and managerial skills. Activities of the associations include industrial visits, technical talks, and participation in technical events in other institutions. A chapter of the energy conservation society is functioning in the college.

IPR CELL
Intellectual Property Rights Cell started functioning at the college with its formal inauguration on 4 April 2011. It works as the nodal center of PIC Kerala. The cell creates awareness among students and faculty about Intellectual Property Rights to increase the Intellectual Property output and provides the assistance needed for filing a patent.

Parent Teacher’s Association
The Parent Teacher's Association (PTA) provides a forum for interaction among parents and teachers. The executive committee chaired by the Principal coordinates the activities of the PTA. Its efforts are oriented towards improving facilities in the college.

Staff club
The staff club facilitates improvement of the social, cultural and educational activities among the staff.

Centre for Continuing Education
CCE conducts courses to students and public, which stay apart from the regular curriculum, thereby generating internal funds for the development of the departments and the institute.

Visiting faculty programme
The programme extends the service of experienced teachers and experts from industries to GECI. Organizations like IITs and IISc, senior faculty from reputed institutions and experts from industries and consultancy services deliver lectures to the students.

Internet and campus connectivity
GECI has a 2 Mbit/s broadband internet connection, along with 10 more 512 Mbit/s connections under National Mission on Education through Information and Communication Technologies (NMEICT) program. The students can use the facilities through Campus Area Network (CAN) and Wireless Area Network (WAN).

Centre for Engineering Research and Development (CERD) 
CERD was established by the government of Kerala to act as a platform for the faculty and student of engineering colleges in the state to pursue their interest in basic and applied research in engineering and technology.

GECI is a nodal centre of CERD and provides centralized computational and other common research facilities, access to information sources, conduct training, seminars, symposia and lecture series in emerging areas of research and research initiation.

EDUSAT Interactive Terminal
The Satellite Interactive Terminal established in the college by the ISRO enables distant education via the EDUSAT. The virtual classroom environment is made alive by multimedia equipment, and students are able to interact in real-time with the subject experts.

Festivals

Kavettam
Kavettam is the arts festival of government engineering college Idukki.

ADVAYA

Over the last nine years has provided a platform for promoting technical, scientific thinking, innovation, and raw ideas to echo, thus creating an unmatched aura of science and technology spectacle year after year.

National Level Multi-Fest of Government Engineering college Idukki: In its endeavour to create a technical symposium for the creative minds of our nation to converge and exchange talent, Advaya strives to break new boundaries and reach new level year after year.

Amenities

College canteen
The canteen was set up with the assistance of the College Development Fund.

Co-operative society
The co-operative society store caters to the needs of the students and employees. Stationery, textbooks, etc. are made available in the store.

Hostel facilities
The college has three main hostels – The Men's Hostel, Ladies' Hostel and a Staff Hostel. They are headed by the Warden, assisted by the Resident Tutors.
The seat availability at the hostels are as follows:
 Men's hostel – I – 45 seats – for second year and higher semester male students
 Men's hostel – II – 45 seats – for first year male students
 PH - 30 seats - male students
 C7 ( Men's hostel-III) - 15 seats
 Ladies hostel – 45 seats – for second year and higher semester female students and female staff members
 Staff hostel – For male staff members

Additional hostel facilities are available for students and staff in nearby off-campus locations:
 Holy Family Ladies Hostel, Thannikkandam, Painavu - hostel run by Catholic Sisters
 Girirani Working Women's Hostel, Kuyilimala (managed by the Idukki District Women's Council), which is situated at a walkable distance from the college provides accommodation for female students.
 Private accommodation for male and female students are available at Cheruthony ( from Painavu).
 Wisdom Homes Boys Hostel run by the SSF state committee located at Cheruthony.

College bus

The institute operates five college buses for the use of staff and students.

Student activities
The college has a students' union, which organises technical, cultural, and entertainment events.

Alumni association
The alumni association consists of student members as well as staff members of the college. The association has organized meet up programs at Trivandrum, Eranakulam and Dubai.

English club
GECI students conduct an English club under the organization of TEQIP and the collaborative effort of LANGUAGE LAB for improving soft skills among students.

Notable alumni
 Ankit Ashokan - Civil Services Examination 2016 rank holder and Indian Police Service officer, Kerala cadre.
 Neena Viswanath - Civil Services Examination 2020 rank holder and Indian Revenue Service officer. 2013 batch CSE.

See also
 Engineering education

References

External links 

 Official website
 Directorate of Technical Education Kerala
 Campus blog and e-magazine
 Photo blog
 Idukki District homepage
 Kerala Entrance Examinations official web portal
 Department of Technical Education
 Idukki District map

Engineering colleges in Kerala
Universities and colleges in Idukki district
Colleges affiliated to Mahatma Gandhi University, Kerala
Educational institutions established in 2000
2000 establishments in Kerala